The term Orthodox Christianity in Lebanon may refer to:

 Eastern Orthodox Christianity in Lebanon, encompassing communities and institutions of the Eastern Orthodox Church, in Lebanon
 Oriental Orthodox Christianity in Lebanon, encompassing communities and institutions of the Oriental Orthodox Church, in Lebanon

See also
 Orthodox Christianity (disambiguation)
 Lebanon (disambiguation)